Neuroxena simulans is a moth of the subfamily Arctiinae first described by Hervé de Toulgoët in 1971. It is found on Madagascar.

References

 

Nyctemerina